Avon Viaduct may refer to any of several bridges crossing the various Rivers Avon:
Avon Viaduct, Linlithgow, Scotland (crosses the Falkirk Avon)
Avon Aqueduct (crosses the Falkirk Avon)
Brandon Viaduct, Warwickshire, England (also known as the "Avon Viaduct"; crosses the Warwickshire Avon)
Midland Counties Railway Viaduct, Rugby (sometimes referred to as the "Avon Viaduct"; crosses the Warwickshire Avon)
Avon Bridge, Bristol (crosses the Bristol Avon)

See also
List of crossings of the River Avon, Warwickshire